Gitmark is a surname. Notable people with the surname include:

Helga Gitmark (1929–2008), Norwegian politician
Peter Skovholt Gitmark (born 1977), Norwegian politician

See also
Githmark

Surnames of Norwegian origin